Kamphaeng Saen station was a railway station on the Suphanburi Line, located in Tambon Huai Mon Thong, Amphoe Kamphaeng Saen, Nakhon Pathom Province, Thailand. The station was changed from a station to a halt on December 15, 1976. There were two platforms, 200 metres in length and the track on platform 2 was 600 metres long. No trains stop here.

Similarly to Yang Prasat and Don Khun Wiset stations, there are platforms on both sides of the track.

References

External links
 Rotfaithai Dot Com 

Defunct railway stations in Thailand